Montenegro participated in the Junior Eurovision Song Contest 2015 in Sofia, Bulgaria. On 1 July 2015 it was confirmed that the internally selected 15-year-old Jana Mirković was chosen. Mirković performed the song "Oluja" in the contest. The performance came thirteenth place with 36 points.

Internal selection
On 1 July 2015, the Montenegrin national broadcaster RTCG announced that Jana Mirković had been internally selected to represent Montenegro in the Junior Eurovision Song Contest 2015, performing the song "Oluja".

Artist and song information

Jana Mirković
Jana Mirković (Montenegrin: Јана Мирковић; born April 2000 in Podgorica, Montenegro, FR Yugoslavia) is a Montenegrin singer. She attended dance and ballet schools, and plays the piano and violin. On 1 July 2015, Mirković was announced as the Montenegrin representative in the Junior Eurovision Song Contest 2015 with the song "Oluja".

Oluja
"Oluja" is a song sung Montenegrin teen singer Jana Mirkovic. The song was written by the same team who composed Serbia's winning Eurovision entry "Molitva". It represented Montenegro at the Junior Eurovision Song Contest 2015 in Bulgaria, ending 13th out of 17 songs with 36 points.

At Junior Eurovision

At the running order draw which took place on 15 November 2015, Montenegro were drawn to perform last on 21 November 2015, following .

Final
Jana Mirković and her four dancers were dressed in costumes: a green dress and dark blue jacket for the Montenegrin representative, and entirely dark blue dresses for the backing dancers. The backdrop began with clouds and rain and transitioned into a colorful city night-scene as the performance progressed.

Voting
The voting during the final consisted of 50 percent public televoting and 50 percent from a jury deliberation. The jury consisted of five music industry professionals who were citizens of the country they represent, with their names published before the contest to ensure transparency. The jury was asked to judge each contestant based on several factors: vocal capacity; stage performance; song's composition and originality; and overall impression by the act. In addition, no member of a national jury could be related in any way to any of the competing acts in such a way that they cannot vote impartially and independently. The individual rankings of each jury member were released one month after the final.

Following the release of the full split voting by the EBU after the conclusion of the competition, it was revealed that Montenegro had placed fourteenth with the public televote and twelfth with the jury vote. In the public vote, Montenegro scored 23 points, while with the jury vote, Montenegro scored 21 points.

Below is a breakdown of points awarded to Montenegro and awarded by Montenegro in the final and the breakdown of the jury voting and televoting conducted during the final.

Detailed voting results
The following members comprised the Montenegrin jury:
 Mihailo Radonjić
 Predrag Nedeljković
 Slobodan Bučevac
 Sanja Perić
 Tina Lazarević

Notes

References

Junior Eurovision Song Contest
Montenegro
Junior